The Captaincy General of Chile (Capitanía General de Chile ) or Governorate of Chile (known colloquially and unofficially as the Kingdom of Chile), was a territory of  the Spanish Empire  from 1541 to 1817 that was, for most of its existence, part of the Viceroyalty of Peru. It comprised most of modern-day Chile and southern parts of Argentina. Its capital was Santiago de Chile. In 1810 it declared itself independent, but in 1814 the Spanish reconquered the territory, but in 1817 it gained independence as the Republic of Chile. It had a number of Spanish governors over its long history and several kings.

Name
The Captaincy General of Chile was incorporated to the Crown of Castile as were all the other Spanish possessions in the New World. The Captaincy General of Chile was first known as New Extremadura (a name subsequently given to a part of Mexico) and then as Indian Flanders.

The administrative apparatus of the Captaincy General of Chile was subordinate to the Council of the Indies and the Laws of the Indies, like the other Spanish colonial possessions. The day-to-day work was handled mostly by viceroys and governors, who represented the king in the overseas territories. The areas of the Americas, which had been the site of complex civilizations or became rich societies were usually referred to by the Spanish as "kingdoms," such as the "New Kingdom of Granada", the "Kingdom of Mexico", or the "Kingdom of Guatemala."

Chile never reached the status of a viceroyalty and was instead classified as a captaincy general because this was a very warlike territory and thus was ruled by a military and not a nobleman like a viceroy. In a colloquial and unofficial way it was known as the Kingdom of Chile (Reyno de Chile in old Spanish spelling) for figuratively speaking the Chilean dominions, although in official documentation, letters, trades, etc., the country is referred to as "Reyno de Chile".

History

Exploration and conquest

In 1536 Diego de Almagro formed the first expedition to explore the territories to the south of the Inca Empire, which had been granted to him as the Governorship of New Toledo. After Almargo's death, Pedro de Valdivia solicited and was granted in 1539 the right to explore and conquer the area with Francisco Pizarro's approval. Valdivia founded the city of Santiago del Nuevo Extremo and a few months later its cabildo (municipal council) appointed him governor and Captain General of New Extremadura on June 11, 1541. Other cities founded during Valdivia's administration were Concepción in 1550, La Imperial in 1551, Santa María Magdalena de Villa Rica and Santa María la Blanca de Valdivia in 1552, and the following year Los Confines and Santiago del Estero on the eastern side of the Andes. In 1553 Valdivia also founded a series of forts for protection of the settled areas: San Felipe de Araucan, San Juan Bautista de Purén and San Diego de Tucapel. After Valdivia's death that same year, these last forts, Villarica and Concepcion were lost.  they were recovered following the war with Lautaro and Caupolicán.  Following the defeat of the Mapuche by García Hurtado de Mendoza, settlements continued to grow and more cities were founded: Cañete de la Frontera on the site of the former Fort San Diego de Tucapel and Villa de San Mateo de Osorno in 1558, San Andrés de Angol in 1560, Ciudad de Mendoza del Nuevo Valle de La Rioja in 1561, San Luis de Loyola Nueva Medina de Rioseco and San Juan de la Frontera in 1562, and Santiago de Castro in 1567.  Martín García Óñez de Loyola founded a last city south of the Bio Bio River, Santa Cruz de Coya, in 1595.

Collapse of southern Chile

A Mapuche revolt was triggered following the news of the battle of Curalaba on the 23 of December 1598, where the vice toqui Pelantaru and his lieutenants Anganamon and Guaiquimilla with three hundred men ambushed and killed the Spanish governor Martín García Óñez de Loyola and nearly all his companions.

Over the next few years the Mapuche were able to destroy or force the abandonment of seven Spanish cities in Mapuche territory: Santa Cruz de Coya (1599), Santa María la Blanca de Valdivia (1599), San Andrés de Los Infantes (1599), La Imperial (1600), Santa María Magdalena de Villa Rica (1602), San Mateo de Osorno (1602), and San Felipe de Araucan (1604).

17th century: Consolidation of the colony

In the 17th century, the Spanish colony of Chile saw a rearrangement of its population center. While in the 16th century, most of the cities founded by the Spanish were located from Bio-Bio southward, with only Santiago, La Serena and some transandine cities located north of it, in the 17th century, Spanish authority and settlements were bought down south of Bío-Bío Region. The colony went from being a gold exporter with potential for expanding to the Strait of Magellan to being one of the Spanish Empire's most problematic and poor in natural resources. The Spanish Empire had to divert silver from Potosí to finance a standing army in Chile to fight in the Arauco War. Since the raids of Francis Drake in Chilean waters more seaborne assaults followed in the 17th century, mostly from Dutch corsairs. The Spanish Empire's attempts to block the entrance to the Pacific Ocean by fortifying the Straits of Magellan were abandoned after the discovery of Hoces Sea, focusing then on fortifying the coastal cities of Chile a tactic that later was proven to be more affordable and effective in combating piracy while keeping the area under Spanish rule.

18th century: Reforms and development

Political history

As noted, the area had been designated a governorship (gobernación) during the initial exploration and settlement of the area, but because the local Amerindian peoples demonstrated fierce resistance, a more autonomous, military-based governmental authority was needed. Thus, the governor was given command of the local military and the title of captain general. This arrangement was seen in many places of the Spanish Empire.

The greatest setback the Spanish settlements suffered was the Disaster of Curalaba in 1598, which nearly wiped them out. All cities south of the Biobío River with the exception of Castro were destroyed. The river became La Frontera the de facto border between Spanish and Native areas for the next century. (See Arauco War.)

Chile lost an important part of its territory with the Bourbon reforms of Charles III, the territories of the city of Mendoza and San Juan from the province of Cuyo were transferred to the domain of the newly created Viceroyalty of the Río de la Plata in 1776. Chile gained two intendancies, Santiago and Concepción in 1786 and became a Bourbon-style Captaincy General in 1789.

Society

Societal groups

The Chilean colonial society was based on a caste system. The Criollos (American born Spaniards) enjoyed privileges like the ownership of encomiendas (Indian labor jurisdictions) and were allowed limited access to government and administrative positions such as corregidor or alférez. Mestizos made up initially a small group, but with time grew to become a majority in Chilean society becoming more numerous than native indigenous peoples. Mestizos were not a homogeneous group and were judged more by appearance and education than by actual ancestry. Native peoples experienced the most discrimination among societal groups in colonial Chile; many of them were used as cheap labor in encomienda, causing their numbers to decrease over time due to disease. Pehuenches, Huilliches and Mapuches living south of La Frontera were not part of the colonial society since they were outside the de facto borders of Chile. Black slaves made up a minority of the population in colonial Chile and had a special status due to their high cost of import and maintenance. Black slaves were often used as housekeepers and other posts of confidence. Peninsulares, Spaniards born in Spain, were a rather small group in late colonial times, some of them came as government officials and some other as merchants. Their role in high government positions in Chile led to resentment among local criollos. Mixing of different groups was not uncommon although marriage between members of the different groups was rare.

During late colonial times new migration pulses took off leading to large numbers of Basque people settling in Chile mingling with landowning criollos, forming a new upper class. Scholar Louis Thayer Ojeda estimates that during the 17th and 18th centuries fully 45% of all immigrants in Chile were Basques.

Sex and marriage
Native indigenous peoples in colonial society appeared, to the average Catholic Spaniard, to be somewhat liberal in their approach to sexual relationships.

16th century Spaniards are known to have been pessimistic about marriage. Many of the initial conquistadores left their own families behind in Spain and started new relationships in Chile. Examples of this is Pedro de Valdivia who held Inés de Suárez as a common law wife while in Chile. Adultery was explicitly forbidden for Catholics and the Council of Trent (1545–1563) made the climate prone for accusations of adultery. Over the course of the 16th, 17th and 18th centuries marital fidelity increased in Chile.

Chilean Antarctica in colonial times 

For many years, cartographers and European explorers speculated about the existence of the Terra Australis Incognita, a vast territory located in the south of the Strait of Magellan and Tierra del Fuego and reached the South Pole.

The Treaty of Tordesillas, signed on June 7  of 1494, set the areas of influence of Spain and Portugal, west and east, respectively, of a line running from pole to pole that was never demarcated (at 46° 37 'W in the Spanish classical interpretation, and further west, according to the Portuguese interpretation), so the Antarctic areas claimed by Chile today, while still unknown at that time, fell within the control of Spain. The treaty, backed by the papal bull Ea quae pro bono pacis in 1506 was made mandatory for all Catholic countries, was not recognized by European non-Catholic states and even by some that were, like France. For Britain, Dutch, Russia and other countries, the Antarctic areas were considered res nullius, a no man's land not subject to the occupation of any nation.

In 1534, The Emperor Charles V divided in three governorates the South American territory :
 New Castile or Peru to Francisco Pizarro,
 New Toledo or Chile to Diego de Almagro and

In 1539, a new governorate was formed south of New León called Terra Australis to Pedro Sanchez de la Hoz. In 1554, the conqueror Pedro de Valdivia, who led the Governorate of Chile, he talked to the Council of the Indies to give the rights of New León and the Terra Australis to Jeronimo de Alderete, which, after the death of Valdivia the following year, became governor of Chile and annexed the Chilean colonial territory.

Proof of this are numerous historical documents, among which include a Royal Decree of 1554:
 

Later, in 1558, the Royal Decree of Brussels it prompted the Chilean colonial government to take ownership in our name from the lands and provinces that fall in the demarcation of the Spanish crown in Referring to the land across the Strait, because at that time it was thought that Tierra del Fuego was an integral part of the Terra Australis.

One of the most important works of Spanish literature, the epic poem La Araucana by Alonso de Ercilla (1569), is also considered by Chile as favorable to their argument, as you can read in the seventh stanza of his Canto I:

In the fourth stanza of his Canto III:

There are also stories and maps, both Chilean and Europeans, indicating the membership of the Terra Australis Antarctica as part of the Captaincy General of Chile.

The Spanish navigator Gabriel de Castilla sailed from Valparaiso in March 1603 in command of three ships in an expedition entrusted by his brother cousin viceroy of Peru, Luis de Velasco y Castilla, to repress the incursions of Dutch privateers in the Southern Seas, reaching 64 degrees south latitude. There have not founded in the Spanish archives documents confirming the reached latitude and sighted land; however, the story of the Dutch sailor Laurenz Claesz (is a testimony dateless, but probably after 1607), documents the latitude and time. Claesz said:

Another Dutch document, published in Amsterdam in three languages in 1622, says that at 64°S there are "very high and mountainous, snow cover, like the country of Norway, all white, land It seemed to extend to the Solomon Islands" This confirms a previous sighting of the lands would be the South Shetland Islands.

Other historians attribute the first sighting of Antarctic land to the Dutch marine Dirk Gerritsz, which would have found the islands now known as South Shetland. According to his account, his ship was diverted from course by a storm after transposing the Strait of Magellan, in the journey of a Dutch expedition to the East Indies in 1599. There are doubts about the veracity of Gerritsz.

At this time was already known the existence of a white continent in south of the Drake Passage, separated from the Tierra del Fuego. In 1772, the British James Cook circumnavigated the waters of the Southern Ocean. which was granted to Pedro Sancho de la Hoz

Economy

See also
Real Audiencia of Concepción
Royal Governor of Chile
Spanish immigration to Chile
Chilean Antarctica in colonial times

References

External links

 
Chile
Former colonies in South America
Former Spanish colonies
Spanish colonization of the Americas

States and territories established in 1541
States and territories disestablished in 1818
Chile

1541 establishments in the Captaincy General of Chile
1818 disestablishments in Chile
Spanish-speaking countries and territories